On 18 March 2012, a car bomb blast in a residential neighbourhood in the Syrian city of Aleppo killed two members of security forces and one female civilian. Some 30 residents were wounded.

Residential buildings and a nearby monastery were severely damaged as a result of the bomb blast.

It was the second bombing in the city in a series of deadly attacks that took place in the city during 2012, in the frames of the Syrian civil war.

See also
 List of bombings during the Syrian Civil War

References

March 2012 crimes
March 2012 events in Syria
Suicide car and truck bombings in Syria
Terrorist incidents in Aleppo during the Syrian civil war
Terrorist incidents in Syria in 2012